Parrino is a surname. Notable people with the surname include: 

Andy Parrino (born 1985), American baseball player
Elian Parrino (born 1988), Argentinian footballer
Marco Parrino (born 1995), Italian businessman and writer
Steven Parrino (1958–2005), American artist and musician

See also
Perrino
Perino